Stemmaphora is a monotypic moth genus of the family Noctuidae. Its only species, Stemmaphora viola, is found in Turkmenistan, Crimea and Uzbekistan. Both the genus and species were first described by Staudinger in 1888.

References

Acontiinae
Monotypic moth genera